Lui is a French adult-entertainment magazine created in November 1963 by Daniel Filipacchi, a fashion photographer turned publisher, Jacques Lanzmann, a jack of all trades turned novelist, and Frank Ténot, a press agent, pataphysician and jazz critic.

The objective was to bring some charm "à la française" to the market of men's magazines, following the success of Playboy in the United States, launched just a decade before.

France, indeed, in the first half of 20th century had an outstanding reputation for erotic publications, feeding also foreign market and inspiring also ersatz French-flavoured magazines abroad, when, for example, US publishers used French-sounding titles like Chère and Dreamé or placed tricolour flags on the covers, attempting to attract the casual buyer. It was anyway a semi-clandestine circulating material, not allowed to be freely displayed or openly bought. In this sense Playboy changed the way 'soft pornography' (become more respectfully 'adult entertainment'), can be publicly circulated.

This magazine was particularly successful from its origins to the early 1980s, but afterwards it began a long decline. It was published regularly until November 1987 (the final issue of this first series was the number 285). After 1987 there was a further attempt to relaunch the title but the publication ceased again in 1994. Passed into the hands of the media group of Michel Birnbaum, after a transient stimulus, it became a pornographic magazine with episodic dissemination. It was published every three months.

After the purchase of the title by Jean-Yves Le Fur, Lui was relaunched on 5 September 2013 as a high-end magazine with Frédéric Beigbeder at its helm.

Lui published by Filipacchi group (1963–1994)

First series (1963–1987)
This magazine successful recipe was combining content with depth articles and beautiful naked women, featuring many B-List but also celebrities, often prominent French actresses, such as Brigitte Bardot, Mireille Darc, Jane Birkin or Marlène Jobert.

It featured a monthly pin-up by Aslan. The first girl to pose on the cover was Valérie Lagrange (the number 1 appeared on 11 January 1963) photographed by Francis Giacobetti, future director of the soft-core movie Emmanuelle 2.

The magazine hosted also a cartoon by Lauzier: Les Sextraordinaires Aventures de Zizi et Peter Panpan. Among the first collaborators are Jean-Louis Bory, René Chateau, Philippe Labro, Francis Dumoulin, Francis Giacobetti, Siné, Michel Mardore, Gilles Sandier and many others.

The magazine motto was Lui, le magazine de l'homme moderne (The Magazine of the Modern Man). In the beginning, it had also a mascot, a cat's head, similarly to the magazine Playboy Bunny, but it disappeared in the early 1970s.

Second series (1987–1994)
The second series was published by the Filipacchi group from 1987 to 1994. It has been published 69 numbers. Its editor was Stéphane de Rosnay in 1989, Brice Couturier 1990 to 1992.

Initially, its specificity (compared to the first series) was that it was published in a two separate books, but from number 27, ""Lui"" returned to be a single book magazine with the new slogan "Le magazine de l'homme civilisé" (The Magazine of civilized man).

The circulation that was in early 1980 of 350,000 copies dropped to 70,000 copies in 1993. In early 1993, the magazine abandoned the monthly release and became bimonthly. The Filipacchi group stopped publication in June 1994.

Lui published by Michel Birnbaum (1995–2010)

Le Nouveau Lui (1995–1997)
The title was used again from 1995 to 1997 (14 issues) and named Le Nouveau Lui by Michel Birnbaum, a radiotherapist physician turned publisher as founder and owner of the holding company Altinea, specializing in magazines about vintage cars. The goal was to return to the roots (and success) of the original publication, intending a more glamour-oriented publication. The coverage of the first issue was dedicated to Miss Agnes. The magazine was again released as a monthly issue and the design of the title was upgraded. For the first time, the cover picture was devoted to one man alone, without an accompanying female model. This attempt to revive the magazine failed, with the final issue published in February 1997 with Eva Herzigová as the cover girl.

Lui pornographic magazine (2001–2010)
The magazine published quarterly from 2001 to 2010 had a pornographic nature. Its slogan was "L'officiel de la photo de charme" or (as on the online edition) "Le charme des filles d'aujourd hui." It was published by the company 1633, whose president and sole shareholder was Michel Birnbaum. Patrick Guérinet was the managing editor until July 2010, when he was succeeded by Francis Guillebon.

Lui published by Jean-Yves Le Fur (2013– )
The magazine was relaunched in 2013 with Léa Seydoux as its first cover girl. Its editor-in-chief was Frédéric Beigbeder.
In March 2017, the magazine went from monthly to quarterly and Frédéric Taddeï succeeded Frédéric Beigbeder as its editor-in-chief.
Covergirls since the first issue have (as of January 2016) included Rihanna, Gisele Bundchen, Rita Ora, Monica Bellucci, Alessandra Ambrosio, Virginie Ledoyen, Naomi Campbell, Kate Moss, Jourdan Dunn, Carolyn Murphy, Joan Smalls, and others. With the exception of Bellucci who appeared semi-clothed, all have appeared topless or fully naked inside their issues.

National editions
 French edition (1963 – )
 German edition (1977–1992)
 Italian edition (1970–1986?)
 Spanish edition (1977–1978?)
 Brazilian edition (1976–?)
 American edition (1972–2007) as Oui

See also
 List of Lui magazine cover models

Notes and references

External links

   

1963 establishments in France
French-language magazines
Men's magazines published in France
Magazines established in 1963
Monthly magazines published in France
Pornographic men's magazines